The NXT United Kingdom Championship was a men's professional wrestling championship that was created and promoted by the American promotion WWE. It was primarily defended as the top championship of the NXT UK brand division, a sister brand of WWE's developmental territory NXT based in the United Kingdom. It was also occasionally defended at NXT events and had also been defended on independent wrestling shows in the United Kingdom before the COVID-19 pandemic.

Established on 15 December 2016 as the WWE United Kingdom Championship, the title was first awarded to Tyler Bate, who won the inaugural WWE United Kingdom Championship Tournament on 15 January 2017. The brand's show of the same name had its first tapings in August 2018, which began airing in October. From its inception up until the debut of NXT UK, the title was primarily defended on the NXT brand and shows produced by UK-based independent wrestling promotions. In January 2020, the title was renamed to reflect its status as the top title of NXT UK. On 4 September 2022 at Worlds Collide, the title was unified into the NXT Championship, officially retiring the title in the process, with Bate, the title's only two-time holder, recognized as the final champion.

History
In a press conference at The O2 Arena on 15 December 2016, Triple H, the chief operating officer and head of NXT for the American professional wrestling promotion WWE, revealed that there would be a 16-man single-elimination tournament to crown the inaugural WWE United Kingdom Champion for the promotion's new United Kingdom division. The tournament was held over a two-day period, 14 and 15 January 2017, and was streamed exclusively on the WWE Network. Tyler Bate won the inaugural tournament to become the first WWE United Kingdom Champion.

Following the inaugural tournament in 2017, the title began being featured on WWE's developmental brand NXT when Bate debuted during the 28 January 2017, tapings of NXT in San Antonio, Texas, which aired 1 February. During the 1 February tapings at the brand's former home base of Full Sail University in Winter Park, Florida, the title's very first defense took place, where Bate defeated Trent Seven (aired 15 February). The title was defended for the first time outside of WWE when Bate retained the title against Mark Andrews on a show for the London-based promotion, Progress Wrestling; the show took place in Orlando, Florida, on 31 March as part of WrestleMania Axxess. The first title change, as well as the first defense to air live, took place on 20 May 2017 at TakeOver: Chicago, where Pete Dunne defeated Bate to become champion. Although unsuccessful, Johnny Gargano was the first wrestler from outside of the United Kingdom division to challenge for the UK title on the 18 November tapings of NXT (aired on 22 November).

When the championship was unveiled in December 2016, it was announced to be the top championship of a new WWE Network show, produced in the United Kingdom. However, it was not until mid-2018 when WWE formally established NXT UK as the brand for their United Kingdom division and sister brand of their American-based NXT. The brand's show, also titled NXT UK, had its first tapings in August, which began airing on 17 October. On the premiere episode, Dunne retained the UK Championship against Noam Dar. During the 17 January 2020 tapings of NXT UK, the title was renamed to NXT United Kingdom Championship to reflect its status as the top title of NXT UK.

In August 2022, WWE announced that the NXT UK brand would go on hiatus and would relaunch as NXT Europe in 2023. As such, NXT UK's championship's were unified into their respective NXT championship counterparts. Subsequently, the NXT United Kingdom Championship was retired on 4 September 2022 at Worlds Collide. At the event, Bron Breakker defeated Tyler Bate to unify the NXT United Kingdom Championship into Breakker's NXT Championship, with Bate, the title's only two-time holder, recognized as the final NXT UK Champion. Breakker went forward as the unified NXT Champion.

Inaugural tournament

Vacant title tournament (2022)

Championship belt design 

The base design of the belt was similar to the WWE Championship belt (introduced in 2014), with notable differences. Instead of a large cut out of the WWE logo, the center plate was modeled after the United Kingdom's royal coat of arms, featuring a lion and a horse (instead of the traditional unicorn) on either side of the arms, with a shield at the center; atop the shield were the crown jewels. The banner atop the arms read "United Kingdom" while the banner below read "Champion". Gold divider bars separated the center plate from the belt's two side plates. In what became a prominent feature of WWE's championship belts, the side plates featured removable center sections that could be replaced with the reigning champion's logo; the default side plates featured the WWE logo on a red globe. The plates were on a black leather strap. When the championship was originally introduced as the WWE United Kingdom Championship, the shield at the center of the main plate featured the WWE logo, but that was changed to the NXT UK logo on 17 January 2020 when the title was renamed to NXT United Kingdom Championship.

Reigns
Over the championship's nearly six year history, there were five reigns between four champions. Tyler Bate was the inaugural champion and is also recognized as the final champion. He also had the most reigns at two, he was the youngest champion at 19, and his second reign was the shortest reign at 59 days (3 days as recognized by WWE due to tape delay, despite Bate appearing as champion on NXT 2.0 a couple of weeks before his title win on NXT UK). Walter had the longest reign, which lasted 870 days, and he was also the oldest champion when he won the title at 31.

Combined reigns

Notes

References

External links 
 Official NXT United Kingdom Championship Title History

WWE NXT championships
National professional wrestling championships
Championship